Zhangwan is a township-level division situated in Dingtao County, Heze, Shandong, China.

See also
List of township-level divisions of Shandong

References

Township-level divisions of Shandong